Beauty and the Beast is a 1962 American romantic fantasy film directed by Edward L. Cahn and starring Joyce Taylor and Mark Damon. It is based on the 18th century fairy tale Beauty and the Beast written by Jeanne-Marie Leprince de Beaumont and features title creature make-up by the legendary Jack Pierce.

Shot in Technicolor and distributed by United Artists, the film is the first English language live action screen adaptation of the fairy tale story. Edward Small, the film's executive producer, described it as a "fairytale for everybody - no messages, no menace."

Plot
Set in the Middle Ages; Lady Althea (Joyce Taylor) travels to the castle of Duke Eduardo (Mark Damon), the heir to the throne, where the two of them are to be married.  But the handsome Eduardo has a horrible secret: A sorcerer's curse—an alchemist, killed by Eduardo's late father—transforms him into a terrifying, wolf-like beast every night.  When Eduardo's scheming rival, Prince Bruno (Michael Pate), who has also has ambitions for the throne, learns of this secret, he tries to seize the throne by stirring up the townspeople, revealing the beast's presence to them, turning them against the beast and setting them-up to kill Eduardo for him.  Only the love of Lady Althea can save the duke and break the power of the curse.

Cast
 Joyce Taylor as Althea
 Mark Damon as Eduardo
 Merry Anders as Sybil
 Walter Burke as Grimaldi
 Eduard Franz as Orsini
 Alexander Lockwood as Man
 Dayton Lummis as Roderick
 Michael Pate as Prince Bruno
 Herman Rudin as Pasquale
 Jon Silo as Benito
 Charles Wagenheim as Mario
 Meg Wyllie as Woman

See also
 List of American films of 1962

References

External links

 
 
 

1962 films
American romantic fantasy films
1960s English-language films
Films based on Beauty and the Beast
Films directed by Edward L. Cahn
United Artists films
Films produced by Edward Small
Films scored by Hugo Friedhofer
1960s romantic fantasy films
1960s American films